Joseph Thomas may refer to:

 V. Joseph Thomas, Indian chief of police
 Joseph Thomas (boxer), South African Olympic boxer
 Joe Thomas (wide receiver) (Joseph Earl Thomas), American football player
 Joseph M. Thomas (1829–?), American politician
 Joseph Miller Thomas (1898–1979), American mathematician
 Joseph T. Thomas (born 1973), Australian citizen whose conviction for receiving funds from Al-Qaeda was overturned on appeal
 Joseph Thomas (surveyor) (1803–?), chief surveyor sent by the Canterbury Association to Canterbury, New Zealand
 Joseph Thomas (architect) (1838–1901), Cornish civil engineer and entrepreneur, chiefly associated with Looe
 L. Joseph Thomas (born 1942), American educator and administrator
 Joseph C. Thomas, member of the Mississippi Senate

See also
 Joe Thomas (disambiguation)